Metroplaza is a shopping centre and office building developed by Sun Hung Kai Properties, officially opened in January 1993. It is located in Kwai Fong, Hong Kong and is opposite to Kwai Fong station of MTR. The mall is a shopping hub of adjacent areas of Kwai Fong, Lai King, Tsing Yi and Kwai Chung. While Metroplaza provides spacious shopping environment, another shopping centre Kwai Chung Plaza adjoining offers varieties of small shops. The mall had undergone major renovation from 2014 to November 2017.

The mall is adjacent to Kwai Tsing Theatre.

Metroplaza Office Towers
The two Metroplaza Towers, are the tallest in the area of Kwai Fong and are therefore the landmarks of the area.

The towers are situated above the shopping centre. The building was completed in 1992. It was designed by architectural firm Wong Tung & Partners, and was developed by Sun Hung Kai Properties. MetroPlaza Tower 2, which stands as the 41st-tallest building in Hong Kong, is composed entirely of commercial office space. The building is an example of postmodern architecture.

MetroPlaza Tower 1 has the same roof height and floor count as MetroPlaza Tower 2, but is significantly shorter due to the absence of a spire; the building does not even rank among the 100 tallest structures in the city.

Tenants include: 16th Floor: Texwinca Holdings, the parent company of Baleno

Gallery

See also
List of tallest buildings in Hong Kong

References

External links

Metroplaza Home page

Shopping malls established in 1993
Shopping centres in Hong Kong
Office buildings in Hong Kong
Sun Hung Kai Properties
1993 establishments in Hong Kong
Skyscraper office buildings in Hong Kong
Twin towers
Office buildings completed in 1992